A tin can phone is a type of acoustic (non-electrical) speech-transmitting device made up of two tin cans, paper cups or similarly shaped items attached to either end of a taut string or wire.

It is a particular case of mechanical telephony, where sound (i.e., vibrations in the air) is converted into vibrations along a liquid or solid medium. These vibrations are transmitted through the medium (string) and then converted back to sound.

History 
Before the invention of the electromagnetic telephone, there were mechanical acoustic devices for transmitting spoken words and music over a greater distance, faster than the speed of sound in air. The very earliest mechanical telephones were based on transmission through pipes or other physical media, and among the very earliest experiments were those conducted by the British physicist and polymath Robert Hooke from 1664 to 1685. From 1664 to 1665 Hooke experimented with sound transmission through a taut distended wire. An acoustic string phone is attributed to him as early as 1667.

The highly similar acoustic tin can telephone, or 'lover's phone', has also been known for centuries. It connects two diaphragms with a taut string or wire, which transmits sound by mechanical vibrations from one to the other along the wire (and not by a modulated electric current). The classic example is the children's toy made by connecting the bottoms of two paper cups, metal cans, or plastic bottles with tautly held string. 

For a short period, acoustic telephones were marketed commercially as niche competitors to the electrical telephone, as they did not fall within the scope of its patent protection. When Alexander Graham Bell's telephone patent expired and dozens of new phone companies flooded the marketplace, acoustic telephone manufacturers could not compete and quickly went out of business.

In the centuries before tin cans and paper cups became commonplace, other cups were used and the devices were sometimes called "lovers' telephones". During the 20th century, they came into common use in preschools and elementary schools to teach children about sound vibration.

Operation 

When the string is pulled taut and someone speaks into one of the cans, its bottom acts as a diaphragm, converting the sound waves into longitudinal mechanical vibrations which vary the tension of the string. These variations in tension set up longitudinal waves in the string which travel to the second can, causing its bottom to vibrate in a similar manner as the first can, thus recreating the sound, which is heard by the second person.

The signal can be directed around corners with at least two methods: The first is to create a loop in the string which is then twisted and anchored to another object. The second uses an extra can positioned on the apex of the corner; the string is threaded through the base of the can to avoid coming into contact with the object around which the signal is to be directed.

See also 
 History of the telephone
 Sound-powered telephone
 Speaking tube

References

External links 

 Tin Can Telephone
 How to Make a Tin Can Telephone

Traditional toys
Telephony equipment